The Lancer 42 is an American sailboat that was designed by Herb David as a motorsailer and cruiser, first built in 1980.

Production
The design was built by Lancer Yachts in the United States from 1980 until 1983, but it is now out of production.

Design
The Lancer 42 is a recreational keelboat, built predominantly of fiberglass, with wood trim. It has a masthead sloop rig, a highly raked stem, a plumb transom, a skeg-mounted rudder controlled by a wheel and a fixed fin keel. It displaces  and carries  of ballast.

See also
List of sailing boat types

References

External links
Photo of a Lancer 42

Keelboats
Motorsailers
1980s sailboat type designs
Sailing yachts
Sailboat type designs by Herb David
Sailboat types built by Lancer Yachts